August 15 is the 227th day of the year (228th in leap years) in the Gregorian calendar.

August 15 may also refer to:
15th August (1993 film), an Indian Bollywood Hindi-language film
 15 August (2001 film) or 15 Août, a French film
 August 15th (2008 film), a Sundance Film Festival short film
 August 15 (2011 film), an Indian crime thriller film
 15 August (2019 film), an Indian Marathi-language film
 August 15 (Eastern Orthodox liturgics)

Date and time disambiguation pages